Turdaș is a commune in Hunedoara County, Transylvania, Romania. It is composed of four villages: Pricaz (Perkász), Râpaș (Répás), Spini (Pád) and Turdaș.

Turdaș has been attested to in various relics found in museums in Germany and Romania. The first is a tax collector report dated to 1334, where in the Catholic priest paid one silver mark in taxes; the Germans in the region were Catholic until the 16th century. According to the report the village had 56 "smokes" or chimneys, i.e. houses. Turdaș is located in an area of Transylvanian Saxon settlement, and the village traditionally had a strong German population.

This is the location of the Turdaş archaeological site, some 7000 years old. The archaeological site was a large Neolithic/Chalcolithic settlement along the course of the river Mureș. It was first researched by Zsófia Torma. The sub-culture Vinča-Turdaș (a late, regional variation of the Vinča culture) is named after this site. Some archaeological culture layers at this site are contemporary with the site at Tărtăria.

References

Communes in Hunedoara County
Localities in Transylvania